Dhorkë Orgocka (25 October 1937 – 31 August 2002) was an Albanian actress.

Biography 
She was born in Korçë. From the age of 16, she was active with the amateur troupe of Korca Theater as a dramatic and comic actress, as a singer as a dancer. In 1951 she was one of the first female actresses of Albanian professional theater. She appeared in drama, comedy and variety films.

Honors 
She received the award of Merited Artist of Albania for her contribution in film and theatre. A road in Tirana and Korce bears her name.

Personal life and death 
Orgocka was married to Albanian actor and director Dhimiter Orgocka until her death. She died in Tirana on 31 August 2002. She was buried in Korçë, and was survived by her husband and two sons.

Filmography 

 Perseri Pranvere (1987) - Nena e Lindes
 Nje vit i gjate (1987) - Nena e Likurgut
 Asgje nuk harrohet (1985) - Nene Xhikua
 Pas Gjurmeve (1978) - Drita
 Flamure ne dallge (1977) - Erisi
 Perballimi (1976) - Mara
 Beni ecen vete (1975) - Teto Ollga
 Horizonte te hapura (1968) - Gruaja e Uranit

References 

1937 births
2002 deaths
Albanian actresses
Merited Artists of Albania